
Angus Hyland (born 1963 in Brighton, East Sussex) is a British graphic designer and visual artist.

Biography 

Hyland studied information design at the London College of Printing and Graphic Art and Design at the Royal College of Art.  After running his own successful studio in Soho in London for ten years, he became a partner in Pentagram's London offices in 1998.

He has worked with a wide range of private and public sector clients including AkzoNobel, Asprey, the BBC, the British Council, the British Museum, Canongate Books, Cass Art, Citibank, the Crafts Council, Daishin Securities, Eat, Getty Images, Grant Thornton International, Mulberry, Nokia, Penguin Random House, Phaidon Press, Pocket Canons, Reed Exhibitions, the Royal Academy of Arts, Maersk, Rolls-Royce, Samsung, The Sage Gateshead, Shakespeare's Globe and the Tate Modern.

In 2005, Hyland was appointed consultant creative director to Laurence King Publishing, and for fifteen years oversaw all aspects of design, brand management, and was responsible for generating new book concepts.

In 2015, Hyland redesigned Eurosport's identity in the first major overhaul of the sports broadcaster's image in 26 years.

Hyland's work has been widely published and exhibited and has received over one hundred creative awards including five D&AD Yellow Pencils and the Grand Prix from the Scottish Design Awards. He also featured in Independent on Sunday's''' "Top Ten Graphic Designers in the UK".

Hyland was the curator of "Picture This", a British Council touring exhibition featuring the work of contemporary London-based illustrators, and "Ballpoint", an exhibition featuring works by fifty artists created with or inspired by the traditional ballpoint pen.

Hyland has authored thirteen books on art and graphic design, and was elected a member of Alliance Graphique Internationale (AGI) in 1999.  In 2002 he received and honorary Master of Arts from the Surrey Institute of Art & Design. In 2012 Hyland was made a visiting fellow at the University of the Arts London. In 2014 and 2015 he served as an External Examiner on the MA Graphic Design course at the Royal College of Art. The Purple Book, published in June 2013 received the Book of the Year Award from the British Book Design and Production Awards.

In June 2021 Hyland was invited to take part in the first of sustainable stationery manufacturer Pith's Creative Commissions. He painted a series of ten bespoke covers which were made into notebooks and sold to raise money for the young people's social project Makebank.

In July 2021, Hyland held his debut exhibition of paintings at the Cass Art Space in Glasgow.

In September 2021, Hyland's paintings on canvas and paper 'Looking for a certain ratio' were included in the 'Design House' exhibition at 14 Cavendish Square, alongside works by Jasper Morrison, Sebastian Cox, 1882 Ltd  and Sebastian Wrong as part of the London Design Festival 2021.

Hyland is married to writer and illustrator Marion Deuchars.

 Writing Pen and Mouse: Commercial Art and Digital Illustration, Edited by Angus Hyland: Laurence King Publishing 2001Hand to Eye: Contemporary Illustration, Edited by Angus Hyland and Roanne Bell: Laurence King Publishing 2003C/ID:Visual Identity and Branding for the Arts, Edited by Angus Hyland and Emily King: Laurence King Publishing 2006The Picture Book: Contemporary Illustration: Edited by Angus Hyland: Laurence King Publishing 2006Symbol, Edited by Angus Hyland and Steven Bateman: Laurence King Publishing 2011The Purple Book: Symbolism and Sensuality in Contemporary Art and Illustration, Written by Angus Hyland and Angharad Lewis: Laurence King Publishing 2013The Book of the Dog, Written by Angus Hyland and Kendra Wilson: Laurence King Publishing 2015The Book of the Bird, Written by Angus Hyland and Kendra Wilson: Laurence King Publishing 2016The Book of the Cat, Written by Angus Hyland and Caroline Roberts: Laurence King Publishing 2017The Maze: A Labyrinthine Compendium, Written by Angus Hyland and Kendra Wilson: Laurence King Publishing 2018The Book of the Horse, Written by Angus Hyland and Caroline Roberts: Laurence King Publishing 2018The Book of the Tree, Written by Angus Hyland and Kendra Wilson: Laurence King Publishing 2021The Book of the Raven'', Written by Angus Hyland and Caroline Roberts: Laurence King Publishing 2021

See also
Pentagram (design studio)

References

External links 
Video
Video

British graphic designers
1963 births
Living people
Artists from London
Alumni of the University of the Arts London
Alumni of the Royal College of Art
Pentagram partners (past and present)